Studio Aperto (lit. Open Studio) is the brand for Italian TV channel of Mediaset network Italia 1's news programmes. Founded by Emilio Fede on 16 January 1991 with the beginning of Gulf War, it's shown domestically on Italia 1. Created by the editors of NewsMediaset, it is directed by Andrea Pucci, as editor-in-chief of NewsMediaset, assisted by Anna Broggiato as co-director.

Background

Italia 1 from 1982 until 1989 did not have television news because it was a channel dedicated to young people. However, from the end of November 1989 Italia 1 Speciale News was broadcast on the channel.

The programme is generally presented by a single newsreader. Most items will be made up of reports and are generally preceded and followed by the correspondent reporting live from the scene of the report.

Daily programme and presenters
12:20 : Presentres Program On Italia 1 
18:00 :Laura Piva 
18:35 :Giulia Ronchi 
Both editions :Irene Tarantelli 
21:25 :Stefania Cavallaro, Sabrina Pieragostini, Patrizia Caregnato, Monica Gasparini, Laura Piva, Giulia Ronch. 
01:30 :Francesca Ambrosini, Maria Vittoria Corà, Eleonora Rossi Castelli, Elisa Triani, Stefania Cavallaro

Daily Programme and presenters On  January  1995 
 12:25: Stefania Cavallaro, Sabrina Pieragostini, Patrizia Caregnato, Monica Gasparini, Laura Piva. 
 18:30: Francesca Ambrosini, Maria Vittoria Corà, Eleonora Rossi Castelli, Elisa Triani. 
 Both editions: Giulia Ronchi, Irene Tarantelli. 
 00:30: Laura Piva, Giulia Ronch
02:30: Presentres Program On Italia 1  .

Criticism and controversy
Studio Aperto has long been accused of promoting right-wing positions, due to the ownership by Silvio Berlusconi.
Other critics are about the huge airing of crime news and soft news (gossip, animals and videos from the Web) subtracting time to more important news.

Editor-in-chief
1991-1993: - Emilio Fede
1993: - Vittorio Corona
1993-2000: - Paolo Liguori
2000-2007: - Mario Giordano
2007-2009: - Giorgio Mulè
2009-2010: - Mario Giordano
2010-2014: - Giovanni Toti
2014-present: - Anna Broggiato

References

External links
 Official site 

1991 Italian television series debuts
1990s Italian television series
2000s Italian television series
2010s Italian television series
Italian television news shows
Mediaset
Italia 1 original programming